Agapius of Caesarea was bishop of Caesarea Maritima from 303 to c. 312. He may have baptized and trained Eusebius, who was to become his successor.

References
Haase, Wolfgang. Rise and Decline of the Roman World (Aufstieg und Niedergang der römischen Welt); p. 2403

4th-century Syrian bishops
Eusebius
Bishops of Caesarea